Hypsioma is a genus of longhorn beetles of the subfamily Lamiinae, containing the following species:

 Hypsioma affinis Thomson, 1860
 Hypsioma amydon Dillon & Dillon, 1945
 Hypsioma aristonia Dillon & Dillon, 1945
 Hypsioma asthenia Martins & Galileo, 1990
 Hypsioma attalia Dillon & Dillon, 1945
 Hypsioma bahiensis Martins & Galileo, 2010
 Hypsioma barbara Martins & Galileo, 1990
 Hypsioma basalis Thomson, 1860
 Hypsioma carioca Martins & Galileo, 2007
 Hypsioma cariua Galileo & Martins, 2007
 Hypsioma chapadensis Dillon & Dillon, 1945
 Hypsioma charila Dillon & Dillon, 1945
 Hypsioma constellata Thomson, 1868
 Hypsioma dejeanii Thomson, 1868
 Hypsioma gibbera Audinet-Serville, 1835
 Hypsioma grisea (Fleutiaux & Sallé, 1889)
 Hypsioma hezia Dillon & Dillon, 1945
 Hypsioma inornata Thomson, 1868
 Hypsioma lyca Dillon & Dillon, 1945
 Hypsioma nesiope Dillon & Dillon, 1945
 Hypsioma opalina Dillon & Dillon, 1945
 Hypsioma pylades Dillon & Dillon, 1945
 Hypsioma renatoi Martins & Galileo, 1990
 Hypsioma rimosa Dillon & Dillon, 1945
 Hypsioma robusta Dillon & Dillon, 1945
 Hypsioma solangeae Galileo & Martins, 2007
 Hypsioma sororcula Martins, 1981
 Hypsioma steinbachi Dillon & Dillon, 1945
 Hypsioma viridis Gilmour, 1950

References

 
Onciderini